Esa Saario (born 22 November 1931) is a Finnish actor. He started studying in Helsinki Theatre Academy in 1956. The headmaster of the academy, Wilho Ilmari, and other teachers allowed Saario to skip one year of school due to Saario's giftedness. Saario ended up graduating in only two years.

Career
Saario worked as an actor for the Finnish National Theatre from 1958 until his retirement in 1997. The first role he played was in 1954 and the last in 2001. Saario performed in over 200 different roles during his career. Some of his most memorable roles on stage were Orgon in Tartuffe, Malcolm in Macbeth, actor/priest in Hamlet and Amiens in As You Like It.

Saario has also played in multiple radio dramas broadcast by the Finnish National broadcaster Yleisradio. His radio drama roles include Police officer Karhunen (Fin. Poliisi Karhunen) in Noita Nokinenä, Marvin in The Hitchhiker's Guide to the Galaxy and several roles in The Men from the Ministry.

Some of Saario's most famous cinema roles are politician Janne Kivivuori in the movies Here, Beneath the North Star and Akseli and Elina. Saario's first roles on screen were seen in the movies Sven Tuuva the Hero and Kankkulan Kaivolla.

In the beginning of 1960s Saario recorded many children's songs, such as "Hottentottilaulu", together with actress Maikki Länsiö. Hottentottilaulu is originally a Norwegian children's song called Visen om vesle Hoa. It was translated into Finnish by Jukka Virtanen.

Saario has also been a member of the Finnish Actor Union (Finnish: Suomen Näyttelijäliitto, Swedish: Finlands Skådespelarförbund), the Board of the Actors of the Finnish National Theatre and the Board of the Finnish National Theatre. Honorary membership of Nummi-Seura Ry, the local Heritage association in Nummi, was given to Saario on the 9th of June 2020. The board of Nummi-Seura recognised Saario's significant and long lasting work for Nummi-Seura and for preserving the local heritage in Nummi for future generations.

Theatre

Filmography

Film

Books
Saario has written two books about the dialect of Nummi. In addition to telling about the Nummi dialect, the first book also tells about the poets and songwriters of the past in Nummi. The first book is called Nummilaist kiälentampaamist. Saario's second book, Sana on jalkava -se menee pian ja pitkält, is a dictionary between words that are only used in Nummi dialect and words in standard Finnish language. A short booklet has also been written by Saario to add more words to the second book. The booklet is called Ei lisä pahitteeks ol, paitti velas ja selkään saamises.

The books are published by Esa Saario and Nummi-Seura, the Association of Nummi Local Area.

Voice acting

References

External links

Finnish actors
1931 births
Living people